Frederick Douglass Academy for Young Men is a Detroit, Michigan grade 6-12 school exclusively for boys. It is a part of Detroit Public Schools (DPS), and it is the only all-male public school in the State of Michigan. It is named after Frederick Douglass and it is located in Woodbridge, in the former Murray–Wright High School.

As of 2012 the school has about 200 students.

History
In July 2006, the Michigan Legislature passed a bill permitting the establishment of all girls' and boys' public schools. The school moved into its current location in 2008.

On Thursday March 29, 2012 50 students walked out of classes to protest against the removal of the school's principal and a lack of and perceived inconsistency in the school's teachers. The activist Helen Moore and two Detroit Public Schools school members, Reverend David Murray and LaMar Lemmons III, marched with the students. The 50 students were suspended from school.

Academics

As of 2012 it typically meets federal adequate yearly progress academic standards; it is one of the few Detroit Public Schools high schools to do so. In 2011 the school did not meet those standards in the English language arts.

DPS offices and facilities
The DPS Office of Code of Conduct, Student Assistance and Support is located in the South Wing of the Douglass building.

The DPS Office of Specialized Student Services (Special Education) Placement Center is in Room 168 of the South Wing.

See also

 Detroit International Academy for Young Women – A public all-girls school in Detroit

References

External links
 Frederick Douglass Academy for Young Men
 
 Douglass Academy for Young Men profile – Detroit Public Schools
  – Detroit Public Schools
  – Detroit Public Schools

Public boys' schools in the United States
Public high schools in Michigan
High schools in Detroit
Boys' schools in Michigan
2008 establishments in Michigan
Educational institutions established in 2008
Detroit Public Schools Community District